Admiral Richards may refer to:

Alan Richards (born 1958), British Royal Navy vice admiral
Charles A. Richard (born 1959), U.S. Navy admiral
Frederick Richards (1833–1912), British Royal Navy admiral
Peter Richards (Royal Navy officer) (1787–1869), British Royal Navy admiral
Thomas R. Richards (born 1947), U.S. Navy rear admiral